The culture of Georgia refers to one of two articles:
Culture of Georgia (country)
Culture of Georgia (U.S. state)